Pliny Fisk (born in Shelburne, Massachusetts, 24 June 1792; died in Beirut, Syria, 23 October 1825) was an American Congregationalist missionary to Europe and the Middle East.

Biography
He graduated from Middlebury College in 1814, and from Andover Theological Seminary in 1818. He was appointed, with Levi Parsons, by the American Board, to the Palestine mission in 1818, and sailed from Boston for Smyrna, 3 November 1819. After travelling extensively in Greece, Egypt, Palestine, and Syria all then parts of the Ottoman Empire. In May 1825 he joined a mission already established in Beirut. He died there of fever in the following October. A niece of his, Fidelia Fisk, was also a noted missionary.

Abolitionist Photius Fisk met Pliny when he was a missionary in Malta in 1822.  Photius modeled his life after Pliny and legally changed his name from Kavasales to Fisk by an act of Congress in 1848.  Photius Fisk  was a teenager when he met Pliny and dedicated his life to the service of the poor and destitute.  Pliny also helped another Greek American travel to the United States by securing his passage to the country.  Pliny was very impressed by Gregory Anthony Perdicaris.  Perdicaris met Fisk while he was briefly in Jerusalem the young Perdicaris spoke five languages.  Perdicaris later became the first American consul to Greece and he was also one of the richest Greek Americans in U.S. HIstory.

Work
Fisk's ability to preach in Italian, French, Greek, and Arabic eminently fitted him to be a missionary. On the day of his death he completed an “English and Arabic Dictionary.” He wrote numerous papers for the Missionary Herald.

References

  This work in turn cites a life of Pliny Fisk by Alvin Bond (Boston, 1828).

External links

Pliny Fisk (1823). Pliny Fisk journal, 1821-1823. Internet Archive.
Pliny Fisk (1824). Pliny Fisk journal, 1823-1824. Internet Archive.

1792 births
1825 deaths
Middlebury College alumni
American Congregationalist missionaries
Congregationalist missionaries in Europe
Congregationalist missionaries in Asia
Protestant missionaries in Greece
Protestant missionaries in Egypt
Protestant missionaries in Palestine (region)
Congregationalist missionaries in Syria
Protestant missionaries in Lebanon
People from Shelburne, Massachusetts
American expatriates in the Ottoman Empire